Brian Mandela Onyango (born 24 July 1994) is a Kenyan professional footballer who currently plays for the Kenya national team and Mamelodi Sundowns as a centre back.

International goals
As of match played 31 May 2016. Kenya score listed first, score column indicates score after each Onyango goal.

References

External links
https://web.archive.org/web/20160720005610/http://www.soka.co.ke/tag/brian_mandela
http://www.fostats.com/player/519/
 
 
 

1994 births
Living people
Footballers from Nairobi
Kenyan footballers
Kenya international footballers
Kenyan expatriate footballers
Tusker F.C. players
Santos F.C. (South Africa) players
Maritzburg United F.C. players
Posta Rangers F.C. players
Kenyan Premier League players
South African Premier Division players
National First Division players
Association football defenders
Expatriate soccer players in South Africa
Kenyan expatriate sportspeople in South Africa